Senenmut (sometimes spelled Senmut, Senemut, or Senmout) was an 18th Dynasty ancient Egyptian architect and government official. His name translates literally as "mother's brother."

Family 
Senenmut was of low commoner birth, born to literate provincial parents, Ramose and Hatnofer (or "Hatnefret") from Iuny (modern Armant). Senenmut is known to have had three brothers (Amenemhet, Minhotep, and Pairy) and two sisters (Ahhotep and Nofrethor). However, only Minhotep is named outside chapel TT71 and tomb TT353, in an inventory on the lid of a chest found in the burial chamber of Ramose and Hatnofer. More information is known about Senenmut than many other non-royal Egyptians because the joint tomb of his parents (the construction of which Senenmut supervised himself) was discovered intact by the Metropolitan Museum in the mid-1930s and preserved. Christine Meyer has offered compelling evidence to show that Senenmut was a bachelor for his entire life: for instance, Senenmut is portrayed alone with his parents in the funerary stelae of his tombs; he was depicted alone, rather than with a wife, in the vignette of Chapter 110 from the Book of the Dead in tomb 353 and, finally, it was one of Senenmut's own brothers, and not one of his sons, who was charged with the execution of Senenmut's funerary rites.

Career
Senenmut first enters the historical record on a national level as the "Steward of the God's Wife" (Hatshepsut) and "Steward of the King's Daughter" (Neferure). Some Egyptologists place Senenmut's entry into royal service during the reign of Thutmose I, but it is far more likely that it occurred during either the reign of Thutmose II or while Hatshepsut was still regent and not pharaoh. After Hatshepsut was crowned pharaoh, Senenmut was given more prestigious titles and became high steward of the king.

Senenmut supervised the quarrying, transport, and erection of twin obelisks, at the time the tallest in the world, at the entrance to the Temple of Karnak. Neither stands today though they were commemorated in the Chapelle Rouge. Karnak's Red Chapel was intended as a barque shrine and may have originally stood between the two obelisks. (The remaining obelisks of Hatshepsut were erected in Year Fifteen as part of her Heb Sed Festival; one still stands in the Temple of Karnak whilst the other is in pieces, having fallen many centuries ago.)

Senenmut claims to be the chief architect of Hatshepsut's works at Deir el-Bahri. Senenmut's masterpiece building project was the Mortuary Temple of Hatshepsut, also known as the Djeser-Djeseru, designed and implemented by Senenmut on a site on the west bank of the Nile, close to the entrance to the Valley of the Kings. The focal point was the Djeser-Djeseru or "the Sublime of the Sublimes" mortuary temple-('Holy (of) Holiests'), a colonnaded structure of perfect harmony built nearly one thousand years before the Parthenon. Djeser-Djeseru sits atop a series of terraces that were once graced with gardens. It is built into a cliff face that rises sharply above it. Djeser-Djeseru and the other buildings of the Deir el-Bahri complex are considered to be among the great buildings of the ancient world. The building complex design is thought to be derived from the mortuary temple of Mentuhotep II built nearly 500 years earlier at Deir-el-Bahri. Senenmut's importance at the royal court under Hatshepsut is unquestionable: 
he was able to lay immediate claim to prime construction sites at Sheikh Abd el-Qurna and Deir el Bahri itself for the excavation of his tomb chapel and burial chamber.

Senenmut's Theban Tomb 71 was started late in Year 7, "shortly after Hatshepsut's accession, the death of Hatnofer, and Hatnofer's interment with the exhumed remains of several family members", while the "excavation on the chapel seems to have continued until after Year 7" of the female pharaoh's reign. Senenmut's tomb appears to have enjoyed Hatshepsut's favour and "his portrayal in the Punt reliefs certainly postdates Year 9" of Hatshepsut.

The earliest known star map in Egypt is found as a main part of a decor in the Tomb of Senenmut. The astronomical ceiling in Senenmut’s tomb (TT 353) is divided into two sections, representing the northern and southern skies. This indicates another dimension of his career, suggesting that he was an ancient astronomer as well.

Some Egyptologists have theorized that Senenmut was Hatshepsut's lover. Facts that are typically cited to support the theory are that Hatshepsut allowed Senenmut to place his name and an image of himself behind one of the main doors in Djeser-Djeseru, and the presence of graffiti in an unfinished tomb used as a rest house by the workers of Djeser-Djeseru depicting a male and a hermaphrodite in pharaonic regalia engaging in an explicit sexual act.

Although it is not known where he is buried, Senenmut had a chapel and a tomb constructed for himself. The chapel is at (TT71) in the Tombs of the Nobles and the tomb is at (TT353), near Hatshepsut's mortuary temple, and contains a famous star ceiling. They were both heavily vandalized during the reign of Thutmose III, perhaps during the latter's campaign to eradicate all trace of Hatshepsut's memory. Neither tomb by itself was complete, as would be expected of an Egyptian tomb for a person of high standing. TT71 is a typical Theban Tomb chapel, but does not have burial chambers. TT353 is fully underground without any overground chapel. They complement each other and are only, together, a full burial monument.

Image gallery

Ostraca depicting Senenmut

Works from his tombs

Sculptures

References

External links
UNESCO "ICOMOS-IAU case study: The Tomb of Senenmut at Western Thebes, Egypt includes map, documents and case study
 The Sen-en-Mut project, current archaeological work on TT 353
Hatshepsut: from Queen to Pharaoh, an exhibition catalog from The Metropolitan Museum of Art (fully available online as PDF), which contains material on Senenmut (see index)
The Tombs of Senenmut: The Architecture and Decoration of Tombs 71 and 353, fully digitized text from The Metropolitan Museum of Art libraries 

Ancient Egyptian high stewards
Ancient Egyptian architects